Livonir Ruschel, simply known as Tuto (born 2 July 1979 in Dionísio Cerqueira) is a Brazilian professional footballer.

Club statistics

External links 

 Player profile and statistics of Livonir Ruschel on One.co.il 

1979 births
Living people
Brazilian footballers
Brazilian expatriate footballers
Campeonato Brasileiro Série A players
Campeonato Brasileiro Série B players
J1 League players
J2 League players
Japan Football League (1992–1998) players
Israeli Premier League players
Kawasaki Frontale players
FC Tokyo players
Urawa Red Diamonds players
Shimizu S-Pulse players
Omiya Ardija players
Shonan Bellmare players
Expatriate footballers in Japan
Associação Atlética Ponte Preta players
Associação Desportiva São Caetano players
Associação Chapecoense de Futebol players
Beitar Jerusalem F.C. players
Expatriate footballers in Israel
Association football forwards